Curon is an Italian supernatural drama television series created by Ezio Abbate, Ivano Fachin, Giovanni Galassi, and Tommaso Matano for Netflix. The series stars Valeria Bilello and Luca Lionello.

The first seven-episode season premiered on 10 June 2020.

Premise
The twins Daria (Margherita Morchio) and Mauro Raina (Federico Russo) return to their mother's eerie small hometown, Curon in Northern Italy. Seventeen years ago, their mother Anna Raina (Valeria Bilello) fled the town, pregnant with the twins, after her own mother's tragic death. The three arrive at the family hotel, which has been closed ever since. After a cold welcome, it becomes apparent that no one wants Anna and her kids back in town, not even Anna's own father, Thomas (Luca Lionello). In fact, the twins do not want to stay either, they are eager to move back to their home in Milan.

After some troubles on their first school day, Daria befriends the teacher's daughter Micki Asper (Juju Di Domenico) and they kiss after a late-night party by the town's lake. When Micki's brother, Giulio (Giulio Brizzi) hears the rumors that his sister could be a lesbian, he cannot believe this and confronts Daria and Micki. Meanwhile, Micki's and Giulio's father, Albert Asper (Alessandro Tedeschi) also seems to have some unresolved history with Anna Raina. Micki struggles with the rejection from her former friend group and the trust breach of her former best friend Lukas (Luca Castellano).

Daria and Mauro discover that Anna had returned because of an incessant nightmare about the circumstances of her mother's death. In the nightmare, Anna saw someone, who looked identical to her, shoot her mother and then turn to point the gun at her. Everything leads them to the town's lake. Anna disappears, and the twins begin searching for her and after a few troubling events they finally solve the mystery of their grandmother's death and uncover the secret surrounding the town's lake.

Cast and characters

 Valeria Bilello  as Anna Raina, a woman who returns to her home town Curon after 17 years
 Luca Lionello  as Thomas Raina, Anna's father who owns an old hotel in Curon
 Federico Russo  as Mauro Raina, Anna's hearing-impaired son and Daria's twin brother.
 Margherita Morchio  as Daria Raina, Anna's daughter and Mauro's twin sister
 Anna Ferzetti  as Klara Asper, a teacher
 Alessandro Tedeschi  as Albert Asper, Klara's husband and a forest ranger
 Juju Di Domenico  as Micki Asper, Daria's new love interest
 Giulio Brizzi  as Giulio Asper, Micki's brother and Davide's friend
 Max Malatesta  as Michael Ober, a local who hates the Rainas
 Luca Castellano  as Lukas, Micki's best friend
 Sebastiano Fumagalli  as Davide, Giulio's friend
 Mihaela Dorlan as young Anna Raina, who appears in flashbacks
 Katja Lechthaler as Lili Raina, Anna's dead mother who appears in a flashback
 Salvatore De Santis  as Berger, a friend of Thomas'
 Giuseppe Gandini  as Matteo, Lukas' father
 Filippo Marsili as young Albert Asper, who appears in flashbacks
 Giulio Cristini as Pietro, Mauro and Daria's father
 Christoph Hülsen as Daniel, a bartender
 Maximilian Dirr as Don Luigi, the priest of Curon
 Markus Candela as young Mauro
 Greta Sacco
 Federica Pocaterra as young Klara, who appears in a flashback

Episodes

Production

The series was shot in and around the town Curon Venosta (Graun im Vinschgau in German) in Northern Italy and in other locations of the Trentino-South Tyrol region.

Reception 
Curon received generally positive reviews. On Rotten Tomatoes, the first season holds a 71% rating based on 7 reviews, with an average score of 6.5/10. Melissa Camacho of Common Sense Media gave the show 3 out of 5 stars, stating: "Curon is a decent pick for anyone looking for a solid supernatural teen drama, but will leave you feeling disappointed if you want something more spine-chilling." Joe Keller of Decider.com wrote: "Curon has its issues, but the two teen leads and their polar-opposites dynamic is compelling enough for us to keep watching." Ronak Kotecha of The Times of India gave it 3.5 out of 5 stars, saying: "The show establishes its context very clearly right from the beginning and hooks you as the 17-year-old twins Daria and Mauro begin their life in Curon. Their first day at school and all the subsequent scenes are quite refreshing as they focus on the skewed relationship between the teenagers ... Also, the show concurrently explores relationships among the youngsters, who make new friends and foes and among the adults, who share a mysterious past. The makers blend it well with the show’s suspenseful narrative that focuses on the curse of Curon. Its core idea of discovering one’s true self is told in a supernatural way, which is only believable if you can digest a heavy dose of suspended reality."

Notes

References

External links

2020 Italian television series debuts
2020s Italian drama television series
Italian horror fiction
2020s supernatural television series